Ángel Miguel (27 December 1929 – 13 April 2009) was a Spanish professional golfer. He is often regarded as one of the pioneers of golf in Spain.

Miguel was born in Madrid. He won 12 major tournaments around the world during the 1950s and 1960s, including the Spanish Open in 1961 and 1964, the French Open in 1956 and the Portuguese Open on three occasions. He also won the Spanish Professionals Championship a record six times.

Miguel represented his country in the Canada Cup on nine occasions. He claimed the individual honours in 1958, and also finished as runners-up in the team event partnered by his brother Sebastián, who also had a successful professional career.

Miguel performed well in The Open Championship, twice finishing in the top ten, with a best of 4th place in 1957. In the 1961 Open he tied for 14th alongside his brother. He also played in the U.S. Masters several times, but only made the halfway cut once, in 1959, when he went on to finish in a tie for 25th place.

Professional wins
1953 Spanish Professionals Championship
1954 Portuguese Open, Spanish Professionals Championship, Open de Cataluña, Alexandria Open
1955 Spanish Professionals Championship, Morocco Open
1956 Open de France, Portuguese Open
1957 Spanish Professionals Championship
1958 Canada Cup (individual title)
1959 Mexican Open
1961 Spanish Open
1962 Argentine Open
1963 Spanish Professionals Championship
1964 Spanish Open, Portuguese Open, Gevacolor Tournament
1965 Swallow-Penfold Tournament, Spanish Professionals Championship, Dutch Open
1966 Agfa-Gevaert Tournament

Results in major championships

Note: Miguel only played in the Masters Tournament and The Open Championship.

CUT = missed the half-way cut
"T" indicates a tie for a place

Team appearances
Canada Cup (representing Spain): 1955, 1956, 1957, 1958 (individual winner), 1959, 1960, 1962, 1964, 1965
Joy Cup (representing the Rest of Europe): 1954, 1955, 1956, 1958

References

Spanish male golfers
European Tour golfers
Golfers from Madrid
1929 births
2009 deaths
20th-century Spanish people
21st-century Spanish people